Tindi is a village in Rõuge Parish, Võru County in Estonia.

References

Villages in Võru County